Global Citizen, also known as Global Poverty Project, is an international education and advocacy organization working to catalyze the movement to end extreme poverty and promote social justice and equity through the lens of intersectionality. The organization was founded by Hugh Evans, Simon Moss and Wei Soo, and aims to increase the number and effectiveness of people taking action to support the cause.

Vision

Global Citizen's vision is a world without extreme poverty by 2030. To achieve this, the organization works with people to make a difference in the present, and focuses on improving the future by changing the systems and policies that keep people in poverty, by utilizing education, communications, advocacy, campaigning, and the media.

The organization researches and selects causes to support, and then suggests actions for its members to take in support of those causes. This can include sending tweets to organizations like the United Nations in support of reducing pollution, signing petitions to support gender equality, sending pre-written emails to politicians to increase international aid, or providing rewards to encourage people to get involved. Each cause supports the UN's Sustainable Development Goals, one of which includes eliminating poverty by 2030.

History

Global Citizen was founded in 2008 as the Global Poverty Project in Melbourne, Australia and has since opened additional offices in London, Berlin, Toronto, Lagos, and Johannesburg and is now headquartered in New York. Since its launch the organization has:

 Developed 1.4 Billion Reasons – a multimedia presentation that explains the issues that contribute to extreme poverty, and what everyday people can do about them,
 Helped launch the international advocacy and fundraising campaign Live Below the Line – engaging more than 24,000 people with the lack of choice inherent in extreme poverty, and raising more than $5 million for anti-poverty initiatives.
 Grown political support for polio eradication and raised more than $118 million for critical vaccination programs through The End of Polio campaign.
Launched the Global Citizen Prize in 2016, a series of awards aimed at honoring activists and leaders around the world.
In July 2017, Global Citizen published its first accountability report for its education commitments. That same year, former Australian Prime Minister Julia Gillard also used the organization's platform to call for $3.1 billion, to give 870 million children access to high-quality education via the organization she chairs, the Global Partnership for Education. Over 263,000 organization members sent tweets, emails, and messages to world leaders and corporations in support. In February 2018, donors pledged over $2.3 billion to the cause.

In April 2020, the organization partnered with Lady Gaga and her mother to produce a globally-televised and streamed concert called One World: Together at Home, featuring celebrities singing from their homes during the coronavirus pandemic. The event raised $129.7 million for different charities, including the World Health Organization's COVID-19 Solidarity Response Fund. This was followed up in June with Global Goal: Unite for Our Future, a virtual event focused on highlighting the disproportionate impact of COVID-19 on marginalized communities.

As of July 2020, $48.4 billion have been pledged to Global Citizen-supported causes, and there have been almost 25 million actions taken by its members. In 2020, Global Citizen won the Webby Award for Public Service and Activism in the category Apps, Mobile & Voice.

Activities

1.4 Billion Reasons

1.4 Billion Reasons presentation is a live multimedia presentation designed to explain why an end to extreme poverty is possible, and the simple actions that every person can take to help bring it about.

Designed in consultation with development and economics advisors, the presentation explores:

• What it means to live in extreme poverty,

• Why the world can end extreme poverty,

• The barriers to overcoming extreme poverty,

• Practical actions any person can take to help tackle extreme poverty.

Patterned after Al Gore's An Inconvenient Truth, the presentation is delivered by volunteer presenters across the United States, United Kingdom, Australia and New Zealand.

Curtis Scholarship 
The Curtis Scholarship is an annual leadership award funded by Global Citizen ambassador and Pearl Jam manager, Kelly Curtis, through the band's Vitalogy Foundation.

Global Citizen Fellowship Program 
The Global Citizen Fellowship was started in 2019 in partnership with Beyonce's BeyGood organization. Every year, ten to fifteen South African young adults are enrolled in the program where they serve paid, year-long fellowships with Global Citizen in Johannesburg. Each fellowship focuses on one of GC's four pillars of activities: creative, campaigns, rewards, and marketing. The fellows follow a five phase curriculum, and are assigned a supervisor from the GC Africa team.

Live Below the Line

Live Below the Line is an awareness and fundraising campaign that challenges people to feed themselves with the equivalent of the extreme poverty line. It aims to give participants personal insights into the lack of opportunity and choice available to people living in extreme poverty, and to open a window onto the challenges faced by those living in extreme poverty.

Global Citizen launched the campaign with The Oaktree Foundation in Australia in 2010, and have since taken the campaign to the United Kingdom, United States and New Zealand – partnering with international development organizations to raise funds for a variety of poverty tackling initiatives.

The campaign has involved more than 24,000 participants, has ‘started more than 400,000 conversations’ and raised more than $5 million for partner organisations working to fight poverty. Hugh Jackman signed on as a Global Advisor to the Global Poverty Project, and is a public face for the Live Below the Line campaign.

End Polio

Since July 2011, the Global Citizen has worked with Rotary and its End Polio campaign. Rotary has been working to eradicate polio for more than 30 years.

As a founding partner of the Global Polio Eradication Initiative, Rotary, End Polio and its partners reduced polio cases by 99.9 percent since the first project to vaccinate children in the Philippines in 1979. This campaign focuses on sharing the story of progress towards polio eradication, while aiming to build public support and momentum required to close the funding gap that is limiting global eradication efforts.

Since launch the campaign has gained signatures from more than 25,000 people and secured an additional $118 million in pledges for polio eradication.

In October 2011 the campaign brought 4,000 people together at The End Polio campaign in Perth, where artists, local celebrities, polio survivors and former Australian Prime  Minister Kevin Rudd spoke about the importance of polio eradication. The next day 4 Governments and the Bill & Melinda Gates Foundation committed an additional $118 million to global polio eradication efforts.

Global Citizen Festival

The inaugural festival, held in 2012, featured Neil Young with Crazy Horse, Tiësto, Foo Fighters, The Black Keys, Band of Horses, K'Naan, and John Legend.

In September 2014, as the world's leaders gathered in New York for the UN General Assembly, the 3rd annual Global Citizen Festival brought top artists and 60,000 change makers together on the Great Lawn of Central Park to urge leaders and citizens to do more to help end extreme poverty. The Prime Minister of India, Narendra Modi gave a seven-minute speech on the global citizen festival stage, ending his speech by saying "May the force be with you". Beyoncé also made a surprise appearance during husband Jay Z's performance.

The Festival celebrated the progress already made in fighting extreme poverty, secured financial commitments for tackling extreme poverty and disease, totaling US$1.3 billion, and called on thousands of ambassadors to take action for change.

The 2012 event featured Neil Young with Crazy Horse, Tiesto, Foo Fighters, The Black Keys, Band of Horses and K'Naan - with a special appearance by John Legend. the Global Citizen app launched alongside the event, and was the tool through which interested people had to earn tickets.

On September 26, 2015 the Global Citizen Festival was hosted by Stephen Colbert, Hugh Jackman and popular YouTube personalities Matthew Santoro and AsapScience. It featured performances from Pearl Jam, Beyoncé, Ed Sheeran, and Coldplay, among others.

Waislitz Global Citizen Awards 
The Waislitz Global Citizen Awards are given to four individuals working to end extreme poverty. Each year, $250,000 is awarded in the form of a $100,000 grand prize, and three additional $50,000 prizes: the disrupter award, the citizen's choice award, and in 2020, the COVID-19 response award. In 2020, the grand prize winner was Haroon Yasin, recognized for his educational organization Orenda. The three additional prizes were awarded to Nnameka Ikegwuonu who founded ColdHubs; Farhad Wajdi for Ebtakar Inspiring Entrepreneurs of Afghanistan Organization; and Muzalema Mwanza for her Safe Motherhood Alliance.

Recovery Plan for the World
A year-long campaign to end COVID-19 for all and kickstart a global recovery was launched on February 23, 2021. The plan is based on five pillars: End COVID-19 for All; End the Hunger Crisis; Resume Learning Everywhere; Protect the Planet; Advance Equity for All. The campaign is supported by the World Health Organization.

References

External links
Official website

Non-profit organisations based in Victoria (Australia)
Poverty-related organizations
Development charities based in Australia